François Pascal Simon Gérard (4 May 1770 – 11 January 1837), titled as Baron Gérard in 1809, was a prominent French painter. He was born in Rome, where his father occupied a post in the house of the French ambassador, and his mother was Italian. After he was made a baron of the Empire in 1809 by Emperor Napoleon, he was known formally as Baron Gérard.

Life and career
François Gérard was born in Rome to J. S. Gérard and Cleria Matteï. At the age of twelve, Gérard obtained admission into the Pension du Roi in Paris. From the Pension, he passed to the studio of the sculptor Augustin Pajou, which he left at the end of two years for the studio of the history painter Nicolas-Guy Brenet, whom he quit almost immediately to place himself under Jacques-Louis David.

In 1789, he competed for the Prix de Rome, which was carried off by his comrade Girodet. In the following year (1790), he again presented himself, but the death of his father prevented the completion of his work and obliged him to accompany his mother to Rome. In 1791, he returned to Paris, but his poverty was so great that he was forced to forgo his studies in favor of employment which would bring in immediate profit. David at once availed himself of his help, and one of that master's most celebrated portraits, of Louis-Michel Le Pelletier de Saint-Fargeau, may owe much to the hand of Gérard. This painting was executed early in 1793, the year in which Gérard, at the request of David, was named a member of the revolutionary tribunal, from the fatal decisions of which he, however, invariably absented himself.

In 1794, he obtained the first prize in a competition, the subject of which was The Tenth of August, that is, the storming of the Tuileries Palace. Further stimulated by the successes of his rival and friend Girodet in the Salons of 1793 and 1794, Gérard (aided by Jean-Baptiste Isabey, the miniaturist) produced in 1795 his famous Bélisaire. In 1796, a portrait of his generous friend (conserved today in the Louvre) obtained undisputed success, and the money received from Isabey for these two works enabled Gérard to execute in 1797 his Psyche et l'Amour (illustration). At last, in 1799, his portrait of Madame Mère established his position as one of the foremost portrait-painters of the day.

In 1808, as many as eight (and in 1810, no less than fourteen) portraits by him were exhibited at the Salon, and these figures afford only an indication of the enormous numbers which he executed yearly. All of the leading figures of the Empire and of the Bourbon Restoration, and all of the most celebrated men and women of Europe, sat for Gérard. This extraordinary vogue was due partly to the charm of his manner and conversation, for his salon was as much frequented as his studio. Madame de Staël, George Canning, Talleyrand and the Duke of Wellington have all borne witness to the attraction of his society.

Rich and famous, Gérard was stung by remorse for earlier ambitions abandoned; at intervals, he had indeed striven with Girodet and other rivals to prove his strength at history painting, still a more prestigious genre than portraiture. His Bataille d'Austerlitz (1810) showed a breadth of invention and style which was even more conspicuous in L'Entrée d'Henri IV à Paris (at Versailles), the work with which in 1817 he paid homage to the returned Louis XVIII. After this date, Gérard declined, watching with impotent grief the progress of the Romantic school.

Loaded with honors – baron of the Empire in 1809, member of the Institut on 7 March 1812, officer of the Légion d'honneur, first painter to the king – he worked on, sad and discouraged. The revolution of 1830 added to his disquiet, and on 11 January 1837, after three days of fever, he died.

Gérard is best remembered for his portraits. The color of his paintings has suffered, but his drawings show in uninjured delicacy the purity of his line, and those of women are specially remarkable for a virginal simplicity and frankness of expression. His students included Heinrich Christoph Kolbe.

Selected works

See also

 Neoclassicism in France

Footnotes

References

Sources

 A biography by Charles Lenormant.
 A biography by Adolphe Viollet-le-Duc followed by François Gérard's correspondence collected by his nephew Henri Gérard.
 A different biography by his nephew Henri Gérard, 14 etched portraits, additional letters and notes.

Notes

External links
 , the painting of 'Mme de Staël as her character Corrine' engraved by Joseph Goodyear for The Amulet annual, 1832.

18th-century French painters
French male painters
19th-century French painters
1770 births
1837 deaths
Pupils of Jacques-Louis David
Members of the Académie des beaux-arts
Burials at Montparnasse Cemetery
Artists from Paris
French people of Italian descent
Barons of the First French Empire
Officiers of the Légion d'honneur
18th-century French male artists